Lactifluus densifolius is a species of agaric fungus in the family Russulaceae. It is found in Zambia, where it grows in miombo woodland.

See also
List of Lactifluus species

References

External links

Fungi described in 1996
Fungi of Africa
densifolius